Amax Engineering was an Australian aircraft manufacturer based in Donvale, Victoria, a suburb of Melbourne. When it was in business, the company specialized in the design and manufacture of kit aircraft for amateur construction. The company designed and supplied kits and plans for both fixed-wing aircraft and autogyros.

Aircraft

References

Defunct aircraft manufacturers of Australia
Autogyros
Homebuilt aircraft